The Foreign Ship Registry Act was a federal legislation that provided for the admission of foreign-built ships to the American registry.

Legal Repercussions
It provided admission of foreign-built ships to the American registry for foreign trade, making it easier for them to legally hoist the American flag.  The bill provided for the survey, measurement, and inspection of such ships, though it did not require American ownership of a majority of stock in corporations applying for American registry, which was a clear violation of international custom and international law.  Theoretically, Germany could get American registration, hoist the U.S. flag on its merchant vessels, and avoid the British Blockade.  This possibility provoked much British protest; however, the German owners of vessels in American harbors dared not risk losing their property and did not take advantage of the act.

Suspension of the 1914 Statute
On September 7, 1917, President Woodrow Wilson issued Executive Order 2696 suspending the United States statute for a period of two years.

See also
Admiralty law
Flag of convenience
International Mercantile Marine Co.
Ship registration

References

Periodical Bibliography

Sources
 Foreign Ship Registration Act
 Text of the Foreign Ship Registry Act
 Foreign Ship REgistraty Act
 

United States federal admiralty and maritime legislation
Ship registration
1914 in American law